Edoardo Iannoni (born 11 April 2001) is an Italian professional footballer who plays as a midfielder for  club Perugia, on loan from Salernitana.

Club career
Iannoni started his career on Serie D club Trastevere.

On 20 June 2020, he signed with Serie B club Salernitana. The midfielder made his Serie B debut on 17 January 2021 against Empoli, as a late substitute.

On 29 January 2021, he was loaned to Juve Stabia.

For the next season, on 20 July 2021 he joined Ancona-Matelica on loan. On 30 October he scored a goal against Viterbese.

On 8 July 2022, Iannoni moved on a new loan to Perugia.

References

External links
 
 

2001 births
Living people
Footballers from Rome
Italian footballers
Association football midfielders
Serie B players
Serie C players
Serie D players
A.S. Roma players
U.S. Salernitana 1919 players
S.S. Juve Stabia players
Ancona-Matelica players
A.C. Perugia Calcio players